John James Snow Jr. (born December 19, 1929) was an American politician in the state of South Carolina. He served in the South Carolina House of Representatives as a member of the Democratic Party from 1977 to 1994 and 2001 to 2002, representing Williamsburg County, South Carolina.

In 1954, Snow graduated from Clemson University with a Bachelor of Science degree. In 1957, he married Penelope Y. Grainger. The couple has three children. Snow is also a farmer and businessman.

References

1929 births
Living people
Democratic Party members of the South Carolina House of Representatives
People from Kingstree, South Carolina
Clemson University alumni
People from Hemingway, South Carolina